American Adventure and similar may refer to:

The American Adventure Theme Park, formerly in Derbyshire, England, now shut down
The American Adventure (Epcot), the host pavilion of the World Showcase at Walt Disney World Resort in Florida (US), and its main attraction
The American Adventure (album), the second music album by UK prog-pop duo The Electric Soft Parade

See also